Krasnohrad Raion is a raion (district) in Kharkiv Oblast of Ukraine. Its administrative center is the town of Krasnohrad. Population: 

On 18 July 2020, as part of the administrative reform of Ukraine, the number of raions of Kharkiv Oblast was reduced to seven, and the area of Krasnohrad Raion was significantly expanded. Three abolished raions, Kehychivka, Sakhnovshchyna, and Zachepylivka Raions, as well as part of Nova Vodolaha Raion, were merged into Krasnohrad Raion. The January 2020 estimate of the raion population was

Subdivisions

Current
After the reform in July 2020, the raion consisted of 6 hromadas:
 Kehychivka settlement hromada with the administration in the urban-type settlement of Kehychivka, transferred from Kehychivka Raion;
 Krasnohrad urban hromada with the administration in the city of Krasnohrad, retained from Krasnohrad Raion;
 Natalyne rural hromada with the administration in the village of Natalyne, retained from Krasnohrad Raion;
 Sakhnovshchyna settlement hromada with the administration in the urban-type settlement of Sakhnovshchyna, transferred from Sakhnovshchyna Raion;
 Starovirivka rural hromada with the administration in the village of Starovirivka, transferred from Nova Vodolaha Raion.
 Zachepylivka settlement hromada with the administration in the urban-type settlement of Zachepylivka, transferred from Zachepylivka Raion.

Before 2020

Before the 2020 reform, the raion consisted of two hromadas:
 Krasnohrad urban hromada with the administration in Krasnohrad;
 Natalyne rural hromada with the administration in Natalyne.

References

Raions of Kharkiv Oblast
1923 establishments in Ukraine